The Boston Psychoanalytic Society and Institute (BPSI) is a psychoanalytic research, training, education facility that is affiliated with the American Psychoanalytic Association and the International Psychoanalytic Association. There were no psychoanalytic societies devoted to Sigmund Freud in Boston prior to his visit to Worcester, Massachusetts in 1909, though after 1909 there were individuals interested in Freud's writings, including James Jackson Putnam, L. Eugene Emerson, Isador Coriat, William Healy, and Augusta Bronner.

The present society and institute (abbreviated BPSI) was founded by psychoanalyst Franz Alexander around 1931.  The BPSI is the third oldest psychoanalytic institute in the United States; the New York Psychoanalytic Institute was first in 1911, and the Chicago Institute for Psychoanalysis was founded in 1930 (like the Boston society, also by Franz Alexander). The Boston organization became a constituent Society of the American Psychoanalytic Association in 1933, and was recognized as a full Society/Institute by APsaA in 1947. In its early years, the Department of Psychiatry at the Massachusetts General Hospital was strongly associated with BPSI, especially through its first chief Stanley Cobb.

Associated figures
Persons who have been associated with the Boston Psychoanalytic Society and Institute include the following:
 
Franz Alexander (22 January 1891 – 8 March 1964), Hungarian-American psychoanalyst and physician who is considered one of the founders of psychosomatic medicine and psychoanalytic criminology. 
Edward Bibring
Grete L. Bibring
Philip Holzman
Felix Deutsch
Helene Deutsch
Erich Lindemann
Arnold Modell
Beata Rank-Minzer 
Hanns Sachs
Elvin Semrad

See also
American Psychoanalytic Association
International Psychoanalytic Association
American Imago

Further reading
Gifford, Sanford. (1978). Psychoanalysis in Boston: Innocence and experience. In G. E. Gifford Jr. (Ed.), Psychoanalysis, psychotherapy and the New England medical scene, 1894-1944 (pp. 325–345). New York: Science History Publications.
Hale, Nathan G. Jr. (1971a). Freud and the Americans: The beginnings of psychoanalysis in the United States, 1876–1917. New York: Oxford University Press.
Hale, Nathan G. Jr. (1971b). James Jackson Putnam and psychoanalysis. Cambridge: Harvard University Press.

References

External links
The Boston Psychoanalytic Society and Institute

Psychology institutes
Organizations based in Boston
Organizations established in 1931
Psychoanalysis in the United States
Psychology organizations based in the United States
Mental health organizations in Massachusetts